Žentour is a multiple award-winning Czech pop rock group led by Janek Ledecký. The band has been active since the early 1980s and has gone through a number of lineup changes over the years, as well as several prolonged breaks. They have released four studio albums as well as three albums of English versions of their Czech material. As of March 2020, Žentour is on hiatus, and they haven't released any fresh material since 2014.

Career
In 1981, jazz musician Jan Šulc was looking for other people at the Prague Conservatory to start a new band. Bass guitarist Jan Černý, keyboardist Petr Ackermann, drummer Václav Kabát, and guitarist and singer Janek Ledecký joined the project. Šulc originally kept the name of his previous band Hemenex (Ham and Eggs), with the assumption that they would play jazz. The other members leaned toward rock, however. The name was changed to Žentour (Horse mill) after the title of one of their first songs. Šulc switched to playing guitar instead of keys and their sound began to fit the new wave genre, which was then gaining popularity in Czechoslovakia. Žentour made their first appearance as an opening act for Abraxas in the fall of 1982. In February 1983, Šulc left the band. Ackermann took over guitar duties and Černý became band leader.

In 1985, drummer Václav Kabát parted ways with the group due to a disagreement with Černý. He was replaced by David Koller (Lucie, Jasná Páka, Kollerband), who also sang backing vocals alongside lead vocalist Ledecký. In 1986, the band recorded their first album, Žentour 001, featuring guest vocals by  actress Ivana Chýlková, as well as an English version, titled Žentour 002 .

In addition to playing concerts in Czechoslovakia, Žentour toured Poland, Sweden, and the Soviet Union. David Koller left at the end of 1987 in order to focus on his other band, Lucie, and Petr Ackermann took over on drums, though he also left shortly after. This was followed by a number of personnel changes. 1990 saw the release of their sophomore album, Žentour 003, once again followed by an English version, Žentour 004, and in 1991 they released Žentour 005 and Žentour 006 (this, again, being the English version of Žentour 005). In 1992, the band broke up when Janek Ledecký left to pursue a solo career.

In 2009, they reunited and toured Slovakia. In 2014, a new album was released, and as per tradition, it was titled Žentour 007, although this time an English version did not follow. The music was written by Černý and the lyrics by Ledecký. Other members of the group at this stage were drummer Štěpán Smetáček, guitarist Lukáš Martinek, and keyboardist Jára Bárta.

Band members

Current
 Janek Ledecký - vocals, guitar
 Jan Černý - bass
 Štěpán Smetáček - drums
 Lukáš Martinek - guitar
 Jára Bárta - keyboards

Past
 David Koller - drums, backing vocals
 Petr Ackermann - keyboards, drums, guitar
 Václav Kabát - drums
 Jan Šulc - keyboards, guitar
 Michal Šenbauer - guitar
 Jiří Šedivý - guitar
 Jaromír Kašpar - drums
 Pavel Skala - drums
 Ája Suková - vocals
 Helena Dlasková - vocals

Discography

Studio albums
 Žentour 001 (1986)
 Žentour 002 (1986 - English version of Žentour 001)
 Žentour 003 (1990)
 Žentour 004 (1990 - English version of Žentour 003)
 Žentour 005 (1991)
 Žentour 006 (1991 - English version of Žentour 005)
 Žentour 007 (2014)

Singles
 "Všechno bude fajn"
 "Proklínám"
 "Utajený světadíl"
 "Skončil flám"
 "Promilujem celou noc"
 "Pojď ven"
 "V příštím životě"

Awards
 Bratislavská lyra (cs) - Bronze prize for "Promilujem celou noc" (1989)

References

External links
 Janek Ledecký official website
 Unofficial Žentour website

Czechoslovak rock music groups
Czech rock music groups
Czech pop music groups
Musical groups from Prague
Musical groups established in 1981
1981 establishments in Czechoslovakia